The discography of Japanese pop girl group Dream consists of four studio albums, five compilation albums, two tribute albums, three extended plays, twenty-seven singles and thirteen video albums. The group debuted under Avex Trax as a three-piece group in 2000, and it has since then undergone many changes. In August 2010, Dream released their official major re-debut single, "My Way: Ulala" under Rhythm Zone after switching management to LDH.

The original trio sold over 950,700 records, and in total the group sold over 1,100,000 records over the span of 10 years.

Studio albums

Extended plays

Compilation albums

Cover albums

Remix albums

Singles

As lead artists

As featured artists

Promotional singles

Other appearances

Video albums

Music video collections

Live concerts

Other video albums

Vinyl

Notes

References

Discographies of Japanese artists
Pop music discographies
Dream (Japanese group)